Thadwe or  Tadwe is a village in Ann Township, Kyaukpyu District, in the Rakhine State of southwestern Burma.

References

External links
Maplandia World Gazetteer

Populated places in Kyaukpyu District
Ann Township